USS Camelia was a steamer acquired by the Union Navy during the American Civil War. She was armed as a gunboat by the Navy and assigned to patrol navigable waterways of the Confederacy to prevent the South from trading with other countries.

Built in New York City in 1862 

Camelia, a screw tugboat, was built in 1862 at New York City as Governor; purchased there 17 September 1863; and commissioned 28 November 1863 with Acting Ensign R. W. Parker assuming command the next day.

Civil War service 
 
From 21 January 1864 to 1 July 1865, Camelia served with the South Atlantic Blockading Squadron off Charleston, South Carolina, and at Port Royal, South Carolina.

In addition to playing a part in the blockade which kept critically needed war materials and civilian commodities from entering the Confederacy, Camelia contributed officers and men to the naval brigade which carried out successful operations ashore in the Broad River area of South Carolina in November and December 1864.

Post-war decommissioning and sale 

Returning to New York City, the tug was sold there 15 August 1865.

References

See also 

 Confederate States Navy

Ships of the Union Navy
Ships built in New York City
Steamships of the United States Navy
Gunboats of the United States Navy
American Civil War patrol vessels of the United States
1862 ships